HD3D is AMD's stereoscopic 3D API.

HD3D exposes a quad buffer for game and software developers, allowing native 3D.
An open HD3D SDK is available, although, for now, only DirectX 9, 10 and 11 are supported.

Support for HDMI-3D-, DisplayPort-3D- and DVI-3D-displays is included in the latest AMD Catalyst.

AMD's Quad-Buffer API is supported by the following GPUs on following AMD products: Radeon HD 5000 Series, Radeon HD 6000 Series, and Radeon HD 7000 Series and A-Series APUs.

See also
 Nvidia 3D Vision

References

3D imaging
AMD software
Stereoscopy
Video game development software